The Country Schoolmaster is a 1954 West German drama film directed by Hans Deppe and starring Barbara Rütting, Claus Holm and Herbert Hübner. It is a remake of the 1933 film of the same title. It is sometimes known by the alternative title Eternal Love.

It was shot at the Bendestorf Studios and on location in Hamburg and Lüneburg Heath. The film's art direction was by Willi Herrmann and Heinrich Weidemann.

Cast
 Barbara Rütting as Ursula Diewen
 Claus Holm as Uwe Karsten Alslev
 Herbert Hübner as Ernst Diewen, Ursulas Vater
 Carola Höhn as Sabine, seine Frau
 Hans Quest as Ludwig, Ursulas Bruder
 Wolfgang Lukschy as Heinrich Heinsius
 Katharina Mayberg as Martha Detleffsen
 Carsta Löck as Minna, Mädchen bei Diewen
 Franz Schafheitlin as Senator Vanlos
 Günther Lüders as Pastor Sunneby
 Käthe Itter as Beate, seine Frau
 Lotte Brackebusch as Uwes Mutter
 Josef Sieber as Jan
 Heidi Brühl as Sternchen
 Claus-Dieter Schmoller as Hänschen
 Käthe Haack as Tante Renate
 Richard Drosten

References

Bibliography 
 Williams, Alan. Film and Nationalism. Rutgers University Press, 2002.

External links 
 

1954 films
1954 drama films
German drama films
West German films
1950s German-language films
Films directed by Hans Deppe
Films based on German novels
Remakes of German films
1950s German films